James Bowdoin III (September 22, 1752 – October 11, 1811) was an American philanthropist and statesman from Boston, Massachusetts. He has born to James Bowdoin in Boston, and graduated from Harvard College in 1771. James then studied law at Oxford and traveled widely in Europe until 1775. When he got the news of the Battle of Lexington he returned home. He served in the Massachusetts state legislature and on the council before attending the Massachusetts’ constitutional convention in 1779 and 1780.

James devoted several years to scholarly pursuits, until he was appointed the United States Ambassador to Spain in 1804. He arrived in Madrid in May, 1805 but never actually assumed the post of ambassador. In March 1806 he and John Armstrong of New York were named commissioners to negotiate boundaries and other issues with Spain. He returned home in 1808 when the talks in Paris ended without success. He was elected a Fellow of the American Academy of Arts and Sciences in 1786.

When Bowdoin College was founded in Maine, he gave the new school 6,000 acres (24 km²) and $5,500. When he died, he also bequeathed his considerable library, papers, mineral collection, scientific apparatus and art collection to the school. He died in 1811 on Naushon Island in Buzzards Bay, Massachusetts.

References

Further reading
 This article about his father devotes the last paragraph to the son, James Bowdoin III.

1752 births
1811 deaths
Harvard College alumni
Fellows of the American Academy of Arts and Sciences
19th-century American diplomats
People from colonial Boston
University and college founders
Patriots in the American Revolution